Barri Sharqi Subdistrict  is a Syrian nahiyah (Subdistrict) located in Salamiyah District in Hama.  According to the Syria Central Bureau of Statistics (CBS), Barri Sharqi Subdistrict had a population of 13767 in the 2004 census.

References 

Barri Sharqi
Salamiyah District